Far from the Madding Crowd is a 1915 British silent drama film produced and directed by Laurence Trimble and starring Florence Turner, Henry Edwards and Malcolm Cherry. Trimble also adapted Thomas Hardy's 1874 novel for the screen. Far from the Madding Crowd is a lost film.

Cast
 Florence Turner as Bathsheba Everdene
 Henry Edwards as Gabriel Oak
 Malcolm Cherry as Farmer Boldwood
 Campbell Gullan as Sergeant Troy
 Marion Grey as Fanny Robin
 Dorothy Rowan as Lyddie
 John MacAndrews as Farmhand
 Johnny Butt as Farmhand
 Jean as Gabriel's dog

Production

The rights to adapt Far from the Madding Crowd for the screen were secured in 1915 by Turner Films, an independent film production company established in England by American film star Florence Turner. Filmmaker Laurence Trimble, who had often directed Turner while they were at Vitagraph Studios, was head of production for Turner Films, which had its studios at Walton-on-Thames.

Little is known about the production, apart from its being shot in authentic locales in Dorset. After the film's premiere on 16 November 1915, at a private screening at London's West End Cinema, the press response was favorable. The Times wrote that Hardy "can have little reason to complain of the way in which his work has been handled. … One feels that the country in which the action is laid is really the Wessex of the novel and that the farm, the cattle, the sheep are the genuine ones over which Gabriel Oak watched with such care." In February 1916, the five-reel feature film was given a general release in Britain.

On 19 June 1916 the film was released in the United States, the first of six Turner productions to be distributed in the U.S. by Mutual Film. The production was panned in a Variety review, which criticized the narrative as hard to follow and deemed the 30-year-old Turner as "no longer qualified physically to portray the roles of the simple ingenue type". The reviewer concluded, "Far from the Madding Crowd is one of those stories of the type that appeared a decade to two ago in The Fireside Companion, intended primarily for consumption in the scullery and pantry by the maids and the cook and the picture carries the same atmosphere."

Hardy does not appear to have seen the film, although he wrote program notes for its premiere. The film's success in Britain prompted him to write his publisher that he was "glad to hear that Far from the Madding Crowd comes out so well." By 1920 Hardy had changed his opinion, saying that it "seems to have been a failure". No boxoffice records are available to determine the film's financial success. Turner Films ceased production after Trimble and Turner returned to the U.S. later in 1916.

References

External links

Article on the lost film, Moviessilently.com 9 June 2013

1915 films
1910s historical drama films
Films directed by Laurence Trimble
Films based on British novels
Films based on works by Thomas Hardy
British silent feature films
Lost British films
British historical drama films
Films set in England
Films set in the 1870s
British black-and-white films
1915 lost films
Lost drama films
1915 drama films
1910s English-language films
1910s British films
Silent drama films
British drama short films